The Great Explorers is the fifth studio album by guitarist Frank Gambale, released in 1993 through Victor Entertainment and reissued on 24 April 2001 through Samson Records.

Track listing

Personnel

Frank Gambale – guitar, electric sitar, synthesizer melody (track 11), sequencing, drum programming (track 9), drums (track 10), bass (track 10), spoken vocals, mixing, production
Freddie Ravel – keyboard, Hammond organ (track 3), synthesizer solo (track 11), piano
Tom Coster – Hammond organ (tracks 2, 11)
Jonathan Mover – drums (except track 10), cymbals (track 9)
Stuart Hamm – bass (except track 10)
Robert M. Biles – engineering, mixing (except tracks 2, 3, 6)
Chris Wood – engineering assistance
Darren Mora – engineering assistance
Walter Spencer – engineering assistance
Tony Cornejo – engineering assistance
Kevin Davis – engineering assistance
Micajah Ryan – mixing (tracks 2, 3, 6)
Bernie Grundman – mastering
Takashi Misu – executive production

References

External links
In Review: Frank Gambale "The Great Explorers" at Guitar Nine Records

Frank Gambale albums
1993 albums
Victor Entertainment albums